was a Japanese manga artist who wrote primarily martial-arts manga celebrating individuality. He is best known for the judo series Hanamaru Legend and its sequel New Hanamaru Legend. He received the 1986 Shogakukan Manga Award for seinen/general manga for Bokkemon.

On 6 March 2013, Iwashige died at age 58.

References

External links
 Profile at The Ultimate Manga Guide

1954 births
2013 deaths
Manga artists from Kagoshima Prefecture
People from Kagoshima